C6orf58 is a humangene located at locus 6q22.33 of chromosome 6 and encodes for UPF0762, a protein which is subsequently secreted after cleavage of a signal peptide. DUF781, which is the singular identifiable domain in UPF0762, is tied to liver development in an orthologous protein in zebrafish. The function of the human UPF0762 is not yet well characterized.

Gene and mRNA

Expression
While there are 3 splice variants of C6orf58, only one encodes a good protein. In humans, C6orf58 expressed sequence tags were primarily detected in the larynx and trachea. Transcripts were only detected during the adult stage of development. Experimental microarray data, however, reveals additional regions of C6orf58 expression, namely in the salivary gland, thyroid, and small intestine. Arsenic may also regulate expression as it increases methylation of the C6orf58 promoter.

Gene Neighborhood
Genes within 500 Kilobases of C6orf58 include RSPO3, C6orf174, KIAA0408, RPL17P23, ECHDC1, RPL5P18, YWHAZP4, LOC100420743, LOC100421513, MRPS17P5, and THEMIS.

Homology
A selected set of homologous sequences are listed below, with sequence identity being calculated in comparison to the human reference sequence.

Protein

Properties

Mass spectrometry has shown that the observed molecular weight of UPF0762 is 32kDa. It remains unclear why the observed molecular weight is less than predicted, even after accounting for cleavage of the signal peptide. Attachment of a sugar at the site of N-linked glycosylation would also increase the molecular weight.

Homology 
UPF0762 shows high homology in primates and orthologous proteins can be traced back as far as trichoplax adhaerens. The list of proteins below is not a comprehensive listing of UPF0762 orthologs. Sequence identity and similarity were determined using BLAST  with the reference human sequence as the query.

Conserved domains 
DUF781 is the singular domain of the protein and spans 318 of the protein's 330 amino acids. DUF781 has been linked to liver development in zebrafish.

Post-translational modifications 
Observed post-translational modifications include N-linked glycosylation at amino acid 69. A signal peptide, which is predicted to direct the protein to the endoplasmic reticulum for secretion, is cleaved from the first 20 amino acids of the peptide sequence. The missense mutation S18F detected in hepatocellular carcinoma significantly reduces the predicted cleavage score of the signal peptide.

Interactions 
Human C6orf58 has been reported to interact with the enzyme ribonucleotide reductase as encoded by the vaccinia virus through a yeast two-hybrid screen.

Pathology 
Statistical analysis has shown C6orf58 to be associated with pancreatic cancer survival time. In addition, a missense mutation at amino acid 18 has been observed in liver cancer cells where serine becomes phenylalanine. Analysis of the mutated protein sequence for a signal peptide shows cleavability at the regular amino acid 20 is lost.  DUF781's association with liver development and the missense mutation's association with liver cancer is a correlation that remains to be investigated.

References

External links